is a female Japanese singer-songwriter from Tokyo, Japan. She is a graduate of Kunitachi College of Music. She sometimes performs as an indie singer under the stage name Mayuko. Her music is produced by FlagShip and Lantis.

Yūmao is a pseudonym that she assumed in late 2002, which she uses primarily when writing and composing songs for anime and games such as Galaxy Angel and D.C.: Da Capo, as well as voice actresses such as Mai Nakahara and Ryoko Shintani.

Her two singles, "Michishirube" and "Sweet Home Song," have both been ending themes for the anime Kashimashi: Girl Meets Girl and Asatte no Houkou respectively. Additionally, her song "Kimi no Tame ni Dekiru Koto" was played in episode twelve of Kashimashi and her song "Omoide ga Hoshikatta" was released on the Please Twins! vocal album Esquisse.

Discography

Yūmao

Singles
Michishirube, released January 25, 2006

Sweet Home Song, released November 8, 2006

Clubhouse Sandwich, released November 7, 2007

Albums
key, released July 5, 2006
"key"

"TAKE OUT!!"

 

someday, released February 14, 2008
クラブハウスサンド
Mr.ロンリーガール
答案用紙
ジンジャーエール
ノウティス
蒼空にくちづけたら
Black cat on the piano
戻れない証拠
スイートホームソング
a direction of the day after tomorrow
someday
fine

Mayuko

Albums
 Aozora, released July 7, 2005
 Akatsuki, released February 11, 2007

External links
Yūmao's official website 

Anime musicians
Japanese women singers
Lantis (company) artists
Singers from Tokyo
Living people
1980 births
Pseudonyms
Kunitachi College of Music alumni